The Redwood Highway refers to the following highway segments in the U.S:
 The entire route of U.S. Route 199
 U.S. Route 101 in California, from its junction with U.S. Route 199 near Crescent City south through the North Coast region and Marin County to the Golden Gate Bridge
 The Avenue of the Giants, which runs parallel to U.S. Route 101 in the South Fork Eel River valley in California.  

Redwood Highway may also refer to:
Redwood Highway (film), a 2013 American independent drama film